The Baldwin–Lomax model is a 0-equation turbulence model used in computational fluid dynamics analysis of turbulent boundary layer flows.

External links
 Baldwin-Lomax model at cfd-online.com

Fluid dynamics
Mathematical modeling